Unelle Snyman (born 25 March 1996) is a South African judoka. She won the silver medal in her event at the 2019 African Games held in Rabat, Morocco. She has also won medals at the African Judo Championships.

Career 

She competed in the girls' 78 kg event at the 2014 Summer Youth Olympics held in Nanjing, China. She also competed in the mixed team event.

In 2019, she won the silver medal in the women's 78 kg event at the African Judo Championships held in Cape Town, South Africa. In the same year, she also competed in the women's 78 kg event at the 2019 World Judo Championships held in Tokyo, Japan where she was eliminated in her first match.

Achievements

References

External links 
 

Living people
1996 births
Place of birth missing (living people)
South African female judoka
Judoka at the 2014 Summer Youth Olympics
African Games medalists in judo
African Games silver medalists for South Africa
Competitors at the 2019 African Games
21st-century South African women